Sheldon Lee was an English association football forward who played professionally in the USISL A-League.

Born in India, Lee grew up in England. In 1992, the twenty-four-year-old Lee was the MVP of the United States Interregional Soccer League outdoor season. In 1993, he was the league's leading scorer and All League. In 1994, he began the season with eight goals in five games, but suffered a season-ending knee injury. In 1997, Lee spent one season with the Orlando Sundogs in the USISL A-League.

References

Living people
English footballers
English expatriate footballers
Orlando Lions (1992–1996) players
Orlando Sundogs players
USISL players
A-League (1995–2004) players
Place of birth missing (living people)
English expatriate sportspeople in the United States
Expatriate soccer players in the United States
Association football forwards
Association football midfielders
Year of birth missing (living people)